Dan G. Johnson (born in Salina, Kansas) is a Republican former Idaho State Senator who represented Districts 6 and 7 and the current mayor of Lewiston, Idaho.

Early life
Johnson earned his bachelor's degree in forest management from the University of Idaho and his master's degree in forest economics from Virginia Tech.

Career
2012 Redistricted to District 6, and with Senator Dan Schmidt redistricted to District 5, Johnson won the May 15, 2012, Republican primary election with 1,968 votes (59.6%), against Representative Jeff Nesset, who had also been redistricted. Johnson won the November 6, 2012, general election with 10,168 votes (55.4%) against Democratic nominee John Bradbury.

Johnson on November 19, 2020, announced that he would run for Pro tempore of Idaho House of Representatives to replace retiring Brent Hill, losing to Chuck Winder.

Johnson was elected Mayor of Lewiston, Idaho in the November 2021 election.

References

External links
Dan G. Johnson at the Idaho Legislature
Campaign site
 

Year of birth missing (living people)
Living people
Republican Party Idaho state senators
People from Lewiston, Idaho
Politicians from Salina, Kansas
University of Idaho alumni
Virginia Tech alumni
21st-century American politicians